The 2020–21 VfL Bochum season was the 83rd season in the club's history.

Review and events

Matches

Legend

Friendly matches

2. Bundesliga

League table

Results summary

Results by round

Matches

DFB-Pokal

Squad

Squad and statistics

Squad, appearances and goals scored

|}

Transfers

Summer

In:

Out:

Winter

In:

Out:

Notes

Sources

External links
 2020–21 VfL Bochum season at Weltfussball.de 
 2020–21 VfL Bochum season at kicker.de 
 2020–21 VfL Bochum season at Fussballdaten.de 

Bochum
VfL Bochum seasons